Protector Forsikring ASA is a Norwegian multinational insurance company, 
headquartered in Oslo, Norway. The company offers property and casualty insurance.

Protector Forsikring was founded by Jostein Sørvoll.

In 2013, the insurance company had over 50 percent of the market share for ownership insurance in Norway.

References

2004 establishments in Norway
Companies based in Oslo
Companies listed on the Oslo Stock Exchange
Financial services companies established in 2004
Insurance companies of Norway